George Ferguson Lennon (24 May 1889 – 1984) was a Scottish footballer who played in the Football League for Bristol Rovers, Luton Town and Stoke.

Career
Lennon was born in Kilwinning and began his football career with local junior side Kilwinning Rangers. He then played in the Scottish Football League for Third Lanark, Forfar Athletic, Abercorn, St Mirren and Ayr United. 

He joined Luton Town in 1920, and spent three seasons with the "Hatters" making 115 League and FA Cup appearances which earned him a move to Stoke in March 1923. He was never fully given a chance as the manager who brought him to the club Arthur Shallcross was sacked in April 1923 and his replacement Jock Rutherford left the club after just four weeks. Tom Mather was appointed Stoke manager in October 1924 and gave Lennon his chance to impress at full back in a match away at Crystal Palace, but he was "ran ragged" by Palace's Welsh international Frank Hoddinott who got a hat-trick as Stoke lost 5–1. Lennon was then told he should leave the club.

He spent a season with Weymouth before playing four matches for Bristol Rovers in 1925–26. According to available statistics, he never scored a goal in official matches during his 15-year career.

Career statistics
Source:

References

Scottish footballers
Bristol Rovers F.C. players
Luton Town F.C. players
Stoke City F.C. players
St Mirren F.C. players
English Football League players
1889 births
1984 deaths
Date of death missing
Kilwinning Rangers F.C. players
Third Lanark A.C. players
Ayr United F.C. players
Abercorn F.C. players
People from Kilwinning
Association football fullbacks
Scottish Football League players
Footballers from North Ayrshire
Scottish Junior Football Association players